Lucilla is a genus of very small air-breathing land snails, terrestrial pulmonate gastropod mollusks or micromollusks in the family Helicodiscidae.

Species
The genus Lucilla includes the following species:
 Lucilla inermis (H. B. Baker, 1929)
 † Lucilla miocaenica Harzhauser, Neubauer & Esu in Harzhauser et al., 2015 
 Lucilla nummus (Vanatta, 1900)
 Lucilla scintilla (Lowe, 1852)
 Lucilla singleyana (Pilsbry, 1889)
 † Lucilla subteres (Clessin, 1877) 
 † Lucilla victoris (Michaud, 1862)

References

 Climo, F.M. (1974). Description and affinities of the subterranean molluscan fauna of New Zealand. New Zealand Journal of Zoology 1: 247–284.

External links

Helicodiscidae
Taxa named by Richard Thomas Lowe
Gastropod genera